Town Pavilion is a 38-story  skyscraper at 1111 Main Street on the northeast corner of 12th and Main Streets in Downtown Kansas City, Missouri, around the corner from Oppenstein Brothers Memorial Park. The tower occupies the former site of several retail buildings—including Kline's Department Store and Kresge's Dime Store. The 11-story former Harzfeld's Department Store and the former Boley Building were preserved, and have been integrated into the design of Town Pavilion.

Completed in 1986, Town Pavilion is the second-tallest habitable building in Kansas City (behind One Kansas City Place), and it is the third-tallest in the state of Missouri (behind One Metropolitan Square in St. Louis). The building's main tenants are Transamerica, Bank Midwest, and the National Association of Insurance Commissioners (NAIC).

Background 
Town Pavilion was constructed originally as "AT&T Town Pavilion" and opened in 1986. It was built as the Southwest Regional Headquarters for AT&T. AT&T occupied the 34-story tower from the opening through present day. However, in about 1997 and due to AT&T's drastic downsizing, they no longer served as the major tenant for the building. Transamerica took most of the office space and placed its name and logo at the top of the tower. The project was undertaken as a joint venture between AT&T Resource Management (AT&T's Real Estate Group) and Copaken, White & Blitt. The architect was HNTB of Kansas City. It was built as a mixed-use office–retail complex. The main component was the three-story retail base (which included a food court on the third floor) and the 34-story office tower. This component took up the entire block of Walnut St., Main St., 11th St. (Petticoat Lane) and 12th St. AT&T's official entrance was at 1100 Walnut St., and the official retail entrance was at 1111 Main St. Also included in this component were two historic renovations: the Harzfeld's building on the corner of 11th and Main, and the Boley Building on the corner of 12th and Walnut. The Boley building was touted to be the first example of French Iron Curtain Wall construction in the United States. This main component was attached to two anchor stores, The Jones Store and Macy's, via sky bridges.  There was also a sky bridge crossing Walnut St. to the 1201 Walnut office tower, as well as a multi-level parking garage that also incorporated two historic renovations, retaining the façade of the Jenkins Music Building, and the Bonfils Building at the corner of 12th and Grand.

History
Town Pavilion was completed in 1986, temporarily becoming the state's tallest building. It contained a shopping mall which was anchored by Dillard's and the Jones Store co. Two years later, it was surpassed in height by One Kansas City Place, which is located at the same 12th and Main Streets intersection.

It was developed by Frank Morgan and his uncle Sherman W. Dreiseszun (operating as MD Management) who would build One Kansas City Place.

Appearance
The exterior of the building was constructed with granite, glass with steel trim. At least 90% of the building is enclosed in glazed glass, most of which is dark-blue. The structural system of the roof is in a truss form.

When viewed from the sky, this skyscraper appears to be a "glass cathedral" in the Latin Cross design. It is unknown as whether or not the architect purposely made it appear this way.

See also
Architecture in Kansas City
One Kansas City Place - Nearby skyscraper, tallest habitable structure in Missouri

References

External links 

Town Pavilion Website

Office buildings completed in 1986
Skyscraper office buildings in Kansas City, Missouri
Downtown Kansas City
1986 establishments in Missouri